William Andrewes Uthwatt  (1882 – 4 December 1952) was a priest of the Church of England. He was the Archdeacon of Huntingdon from 1943 to 1947.

Life
Andrewes Uthwatt was born in Ballarat, the son of Thomas Andrewes, and educated at Trinity College, Cambridge. He was ordained in 1904 and was a curate at St Mary's Portsea. Later he was Archdeacon of Northern Melanesia and then a temporary chaplain to the British Armed Forces during World War I. When peace returned he was a curate at Southwell Minster and then held incumbencies in Derby, Bottisham, Brampton and finally Diddington.

Augustus Uthwatt, Baron Uthwatt, his brother, was a prominent judge.

References

1882 births
1952 deaths
People from Ballarat
People educated at Oswestry School
Alumni of Trinity College, Cambridge
Archdeacons of Huntingdon
World War I chaplains
Royal Army Chaplains' Department officers
Archdeacons of Northern Melanesia